The dwarf pygmy goby or Philippine goby (Pandaka pygmaea) is a tropical species of fish in the subfamily Gobionellinae from brackish water and mangrove areas in Southeast Asia. It is one of the smallest fish species in the world. It is known as bia and tabios in the Philippines.

Distribution and habitat
P. pygmaea was initially reported as being endemic to Malabon, Metro Manila in the Philippines, where found at shady river banks. The species has now  been extirpated from this area as it was reclaimed, leading to its status as critically endangered by the IUCN. More recently, it has been discovered at a range of other locations in Southeast Asia, including Culion Island, Bali, Sulawesi and Singapore. As part of the aquarium trade, it was imported into Germany in 1958.

P. pygmaea lives in shallow, tropical brackish water and mangrove areas where mainly found on muddy bottoms or among plants. Also known before as National Fish in the Philippines on 1994 until recently they changed it to milk fish.

Appearance and anatomy
A colorless and nearly transparent species, the dwarf pygmy goby has a moderately elongated and robust body.  Males are slender with nearly straight dorsal and ventral profiles, while the females appear stouter with the dorsal profile slightly curved, the belly protuberant, and the ventral outline strongly arched.

The head of the P. pygmaea is large and blunt.  The head and nape are naked.  The upper and lower profiles converge and are pointed if viewed from the sides.  The head is characteristically broader than deep.  The head is very short, broad and rounded. The mouth is very oblique, with a projecting lower jaw and chin.  The posterior angle of the maxillary extends beneath the anterior part of the eye, up to the middle of pupil.  It possesses two rows of teeth in each jaw.  The outer row of teeth inside the upper jaw is larger and more widely spaced, while the inner row is characteristically minute.  The first dorsal fin is low, much in advance of the second dorsal fin but not reaching the second dorsal fin when depressed.  The pectoral and ventral fins are pointed, with the latter about as long as the former or longer.  The anal papilla is very short and rounded in females, but is longer and very slender in males.

P. pygmaea have dark spots, which forms 4 cross-bands, over the sides of its body.  The bases of the fins are heavily pigmented, except for the ventral fins. It has 22 to 25 scales in longitudinal series.

Behavior

Feeding
This species feeds on plankton.

Reproduction
P. pygmaea is an oviparous species.

Miscellaneous
Pandaka pygmaea was once portrayed on a Philippine ten centavo coin where, uniquely for a wildlife portrayal on coinage, it is depicted at life-size. The genus name is derived from the Filipino word pandak, meaning "dwarf" or "short of stature".

See also
Seven-figure pygmy goby

References

External links

Photograph and Description of Pandaka pygmaea, Herre, 1927, Dwarf pygmy goby, Pandaka pygmaea, NSMT-P 66047, 1.0 cm SL, Fishes of Libong Island, Kahaku.Go.jp, retrieved on July 14, 2007
Pandaka pygmaea, Herre, 1927, Taxonomic Serial No.: 172193, ITIS.gov, retrieved on: July 14, 2007
Chen, Loris. Gobies: Going, Going, Gone? A WebQuest for 6-8th Grade (Science) (lchen@wyckoffschools.org), Ocean Biographic Information System, Census of Marine Life, Rutgers, The State University of New Jersey, 2002-2007. IOBIS.org, retrieved on July 14, 2007
Fenner, Bob.  "True" or Combtooth Gobies, the Family Gobiidae, Wetwebmedia.com (undated), retrieved on July 14, 2007

Pandaka (fish)
Fish of Indonesia
Freshwater fish of Indonesia
Fish of the Philippines
Freshwater fish of the Philippines
Fish of Singapore
Taxa named by Albert William Herre
Fish described in 1927